Mladinski nogometni klub Izola, commonly referred to as MNK Izola or simply Izola, is a Slovenian football club from Izola which competes in the Slovenian Third League. Izola was established in 1996 after the dissolution of NK Izola, a club which folded following the 1995–96 Slovenian PrvaLiga season due to high financial debt. Legally, the two clubs' records and honours are kept separate by the Football Association of Slovenia.

Honours
Slovenian Third League
 Winners: 2001–02

Littoral League (fourth tier)
 Winners: 2000–01

References

External links
Official website 

Football clubs in Slovenia
Association football clubs established in 1996
1996 establishments in Slovenia